Margachitina is an extinct genus of chitinozoans. It was described by Alfred Eisenack in 1968.

Species
 Margachitina banwyensis Mullins, 2000
 Margachitina margaritana (Eisenack, 1937)
 Margachitina poculum (Collinson & Schwalb, 1955)

References

Prehistoric marine animals
Fossil taxa described in 1968